This is a list of cities in Oceania (including Australia) with a population of over 80,000. National and territorial capitals are shown in bold type.

See also
 Lists of cities in Oceania

References

External links
 Geopolis

Oceania
Oceania
 Largest
Populous cities
Cities in Oceania